The Q-type calcium channel is a type of voltage-dependent calcium channel. Like the others of this class, the α1 subunit is the one that determines most of the channel's properties.

They are poorly understood, but like R-type calcium channels, they appear to be present in cerebellar granule cells. They have a high threshold of activation and relatively slow kinetics.

External links
 

Ion channels
Electrophysiology
Membrane biology
Integral membrane proteins
Calcium channels